Henry Frederick may refer to:

 Henry Frederick, Prince of Wales (1594–1612), Duke of Cornwall and of Rothesay, etc., eldest son of James I of England, VI of Scots
 Henry Frederick Werker (1920–1984), American lawyer
 Prince Henry Frederick, Duke of Cumberland and Strathearn (1745–1790), Grand Master of the Premier Grand Lodge of England
 Henry Frederick, Count of Hohenlohe-Langenburg (1625–1699)
 Henry Frederick, Hereditary Prince of the Palatinate (1614–1629)

See also
 
 Henry Frederick Conrad Sander (1847–1920), German-born orchidologist and nurseryman
 H. F. Baker (Henry Frederick Baker, 1866–1956), British mathematician
 Frederick Heinrich
 Frederick Henry (disambiguation)
 Friedrich Heinrich
 Heinrich Friedrich